Saturday Church is a 2017 American musical fantasy drama film written and directed by Damon Cardasis; and was his first feature film. The film stars Luka Kain, Margot Bingham, Regina Taylor, Marquis Rodriguez, Michaela Jaé Rodriguez, and Indya Moore. The film was released on January 12, 2018, by Samuel Goldwyn Films. The concept of the movie is loosely based on the LGBTQ+ outreach program, Art & Acceptance, at St Luke in the Fields located in the West Village of New York City.

Plot
Fourteen-year-old Ulysses lives with his mother, Amara, and younger brother. Because his father has recently died, his father's sister, the conservative Aunt Rose, agrees to help take care of Ulysses and his brother while their mother is at work. Ulysses is bullied at school by his classmates and threatened at home by Rose for his feminine characteristics.

One night Ulysses ventures out into the city and meets a group of transgender and gay individuals, Ebony, Dijon, Raymond, and Heaven.  Ebony invites Ulysses to Saturday Church, a program run at a church every Saturday to feed and provide shelter for LGBT youths. While there Ulysses develops an interest in voguing, later buying a pair of high-heel shoes to practice in.

Ulysses also begins to form a relationship with Raymond, who has mutual feelings for him.  After returning home from school one day, Aunt Rose is waiting for Ulysses and confronts him about the high-heels, which she discovered in his room. Rose begins to beat Ulysses, causing him to run away from the house.

Ulysses attempts to go to Saturday Church for help, but as it is Wednesday, none of his friends are there. Ulysses spends the night at a homeless shelter, where he resolves to accept himself for who he is and not who others want him to be. The next day, Ulysses talks to an older male who invites him to his apartment.

Desperate and hungry, Ulysses prostitutes himself to the man for food and money. On Saturday, Ulysses returns to Saturday Church, where his friends comfort him and offer a place to stay, but Ulysses wants to see his mother. Back at the house, Amara, who has reported Ulysses as missing to the police, prepares to search for him.

Before she leaves, Ebony escorts Ulysses into the house.  Rose, who is also there, verbally berates Ebony and Ulysses, causing Amara to defend them from her sister-in-law until Rose leaves. The next day, Amara reassures Ulysses that her love for him is unconditional. With newfound confidence, Ulysses prepares to vogue in drag in a ballroom scene club.

Cast

Release
The film premiered at the Tribeca Film Festival on April 23, 2017. On September 5, 2017, Samuel Goldwyn Films acquired distribution rights to the film. The film was released on January 12, 2018, by Samuel Goldwyn Films.

Reception
The review aggregator website Rotten Tomatoes gives the film a rating of 93%, based on 28 reviews, with an average rating of 7.4/10. On Metacritic, the film has a score of 72 out of 100, based on 12 critics, indicating "generally favorable reviews".

References

External links
 

2017 films
African-American LGBT-related films
2010s musical drama films
2017 fantasy films
2017 LGBT-related films
2010s musical films
American musical drama films
American fantasy films
American musical films
LGBT-related musical films
Transgender-related films
2017 drama films
2010s English-language films
2010s American films